Earl Gaines, Jr. (August 19, 1935 – December 31, 2009) was an American soul blues and electric blues singer. Born in Decatur, Alabama, he sang lead vocals on the hit single "It's Love Baby (24 Hours a Day)", credited to Louis Brooks and his Hi-Toppers, before undertaking a low-key solo career. In the latter capacity he had minor success with "The Best of Luck to You" (1966) and "Hymn Number 5" (1973). Noted as the best R&B singer from Nashville, Gaines was also known for his lengthy career.

Biography
Gaines was born in Decatur, Alabama, in 1935. After moving from his hometown in his teenage years, and relocating to Nashville, Tennessee, he found employment as both a singer and occasional drummer. Via work he did for local songwriter Ted Jarrett, Gaines moved from singing in clubs to meeting Louis Brooks.  Brooks led the instrumental Hi-Toppers group, who had a recording contract with the Excello label. Their subsequent joint recording, "It's Love Baby (24 Hours a Day)," peaked at No. 2 on the US Billboard R&B chart in 1955. It was Gaines' biggest hit, but his name was not credited on the record.

Breaking away from the confines of the group, Gaines became part of the 1955 R&B Caravan of Stars, with Bo Diddley, Big Joe Turner, and Etta James. Their tour culminated with an appearance at New York's Carnegie Hall.  Without any tangible success, Gaines recorded for the Champion and Poncello labels for another few years, as well as joining Bill Doggett's band as lead vocalist. In 1963, he joined Bill "Hoss" Allen's repertoire of artists, and by 1966 had issued the album The Best of Luck to You, seeing the title track reach the Top 40 in the US R&B chart. He appeared on the television program The !!!! Beat, and later released material for King and Sound Stage 7, including his cover version of "Hymn Number 5". Recordings made between 1967 and 1973 for De Luxe were reissued in 1998. On many of his De Luxe recordings in the late 1960s and early 1970s, Gaines was backed by Freddy Robinson's orchestra.

In 1975, Gaines recorded "Drowning On Dry Land" for Ace, before leaving the music industry for almost a decade and a half, to work as a truck driver. He finally re-emerged in 1989 with the album House Party.

In the 1990s Gaines worked with Roscoe Shelton and Clifford Curry.  On Appaloosa Records, Gaines issued I Believe in Your Love (1995), and in 1997 he reunited with Curry and Shelton for a collaborative live album. He released Everything’s Gonna Be Alright in 1998. Gaines work was on the 2005 Grammy Award-winning Night Train To Nashville: Music City Rhythm & Blues, 1945–1970, an exhibit at the Country Music Hall of Fame and Museum. His own albums The Different Feelings of Blues and Soul (2005) and Nothin’ But the Blues (2008) followed, the latter released on the Ecko label.

In late 2009 Gaines had to cancel a concert tour of Europe due to ill health, and he died in Nashville on the last day of that year, at the age of 74.

Discography

Albums
The Best of Luck to You (1966) - HBR Records
Lovin' Blues (1970) - De Luxe Records
That's How Strong My Love Is (1979) - Vivid Sound Records
Yearning and Burning (1986) - Charly Records
House Party (1989) - Meltone Records
I Believe in Your Love (1995) - Appaloosa Records
Tennessee R&B Live (1997) - Appaloosa Records (with Roscoe Shelton and Clifford Curry)
Everything's Gonna Be Alright (1998) - Black Top Records
24 Hours a Day (1999) - Black Magic Records
Let's Work Together (2000) - Cannonball Records (with Roscoe Shelton)
The Different Feelings of Blues and Soul (2005) - Blue Fye Records
The Lost Soul Tapes (2006) - Aim Records
Crankshaft Blues (2007) - SPV Records
Nothin' But the Blues (2008) - Ecko Records
Good To Me (2010) - Ecko Records - Released posthumously

Chart singles
"The Best of Luck to You" (1966) - HBR Records - US R&B #28

See also
List of soul-blues musicians

References

External links
Photographs and image s at Google.co.uk
Obituary at Blues.about.com

1935 births
2009 deaths
American blues drummers
American blues singers
American rhythm and blues singers
Soul-blues musicians
Electric blues musicians
Blues musicians from Alabama
20th-century American singers
20th-century American male singers